Manebhanjyang is a small town which lies in Khandbari Municipality of Sankhuwasabha District in the Kosi Zone of Eastern Nepal.

References

External links
UN map of the municipalities of sankhuwasabha District

Populated places in Sankhuwasabha District